Senator Winner may refer to:

George H. Winner Jr. (born 1949), New York State Senate
Leslie Winner (born 1950), North Carolina State Senate